Boadella i les Escaules is a municipality in the comarca of the Alt Empordà in Girona, Catalonia, Spain. The former name, Boadella d'Empordà, was changed in 2004 when the town of Les Escaules joined Boadella d'Empordà. It is situated in the valley of the Muga river, which is dammed to form the reservoir of Pantà de Boadella, a tourist attraction, and to generate hydroelectric power. Local roads link the village with Biure and Terrades.

Demography

References

 Panareda Clopés, Josep Maria; Rios Calvet, Jaume; Rabella Vives, Josep Maria (1989). Guia de Catalunya, Barcelona: Caixa de Catalunya.  (Spanish).  (Catalan).

External links
Official website 
 Government data pages 

Municipalities in Alt Empordà
Populated places in Alt Empordà